Colonel Edward McAlexander (1833–1870) was an American Confederate veteran, physician and politician.

Early life
Edward McAlexander was born on March 2, 1833, in Alabama. He graduated from LaGrange College, now the University of North Alabama.

Career
McAlexander was a physician. During the American Civil War of 1861–1865, he joined the Confederate States Army and served in the 26th Regiment Alabama Infantry. He was promoted to the rank of Major on January 30, 1862, and as Colonel on April 9, 1865.

McAlexander served as a member of the Alabama House of Representatives from 1865 to 1867.

Personal life and death
McAlexander was married twice: first to Elizabeth J. Koger, and secondly to Sarah A. Koger. He died on October 13, 1870, in Lauderdale County, Alabama. He was buried at the Florence Cemetery in Florence, Alabama.

References

External links

1833 births
1870 deaths
People from Lauderdale County, Alabama
University of North Alabama alumni
Confederate States Army officers
Members of the Alabama House of Representatives
19th-century American politicians